Dario  Dentale (born 26 October 1982 in Castellamare di Stabia) is an Italian rower.

References
 

1982 births
Living people
Italian male rowers
Olympic rowers of Italy
Rowers at the 2004 Summer Olympics
Rowers at the 2008 Summer Olympics
Olympic medalists in rowing
Medalists at the 2004 Summer Olympics
World Rowing Championships medalists for Italy
Olympic bronze medalists for Italy